Alessandro Cicognini (15 January 1906 – 9 November 1995) was an Italian composer who is chiefly remembered for his film scores.

Biography

Born in Pescara, Cicognini graduated with a degree in music composition from the Milan Conservatory in 1927 where he was a pupil of Giulio Cesare Paribeni and Renzo Bossi. In 1933 his opera, Donna Lombarda, inspired by a popular folk ballad, premiered at the Teatro Regio in Turin. From then, with the exceptions of Messa a 5 voci and Saul, he focused his activities on composing musical scores for over 100 films, often collaborating with filmmakers Vittorio de Sica and Alessandro Blasetti. Much of his film music makes use of small ensembles and unusual instrumentation, rather than the lush orchestral scores common to film music of the mid-20th century. His style has been described as late-romantic, and was characterized by immediacy and catchiness. In 1965 he retired from film composition and became a teacher; one of his soundtracks, to the 1953 film Stazione Termini, was reused in What's Eating Gilbert Grape in 1993.

Cicognini died in Rome on 9 November 1995 at the age of 89.

Film scores

	Il compagno don Camillo (1965)
	The Pigeon That Took Rome (1962)
	Il giudizio universale (1961)
	Don Camillo monsignore... ma non troppo (1961)
	A Breath of Scandal (1960)
	It Started in Naples (1960)
	Bread, Love and Andalusia (1959)
	The Black Orchid (film) (1958)
	Anna di Brooklyn (1958)
	È arrivata la parigina (1958)
	Vacanze a Ischia (1957)
	Il tetto (1956)
	Il bigamo (1956)
	La fortuna di essere donna (1956)
	La banda degli onesti (1956)
	La finestra sul Luna Park (1956)
	Loser Takes All (1956)
	Tempo di villeggiatura (1956)
	Totò, Peppino e i fuorilegge (1956)
	Pane, amore e... (1955)
	Don Camillo e l'onorevole Peppone (1955)
	Summertime (1955)
	Gli ultimi cinque minuti (1955)
	L'arte di arrangiarsi (1955)
	Siamo uomini o caporali (1955)
	Ulysses (1954)
	Peccato che sia una canaglia (1954)
	L'oro di Napoli (1954)
	Pane, amore e gelosia (1954)
	Tempi nostri (1954)
	Graziella (1954)
	Pane, amore e fantasia (1953)
	Siamo donne (1953)
	Il ritorno di Don Camillo (1953)
	Stazione Termini (1953)
	Gli eroi della domenica (1953)
	Wanda la peccatrice (1952)
	Two Cents Worth of Hope (1952)
	Don Camillo (1952)
	Buongiorno, elefante! (1952)
	Umberto D. (1952)
	Altri tempi (1952)
	Moglie per una notte (1952)
	Il segreto delle tre punte (1952)
	La strada finisce sul fiume (1951)
	Guardie e ladri (1951)
	I sette nani alla riscossa (1951)
	Cameriera bella presenza offresi... (1951)
	Miracolo a Milano (1951)
	Prima comunione (1950)
 	Cavalcata d'eroi (1950)
	Domani è troppo tardi (1950)
	Il ladro di Venezia (1950)
	Vogliamoci bene! (1950)
	Fiamma che non si spegne (1949)
	Il grido della terra (1949)
	Il Conte Ugolino (1949)
	Ho sognato il Paradiso (1949)
	Paolo e Francesca (1949)
	Rondini in volo (1949)
	Lo sparviero del Nilo (1949)
	Ladri di biciclette (1948)
	Il cavaliere misterioso (1948)
	Il cavaliere del sogno (1947)
	Ultimo amore (1947)
	Il duomo di Milano (1947)
	Cronaca nera (1947)
	Le avventure di Pinocchio (1947)
	Sciuscià (1946)
	La sua strada (1946)
	Lo sconosciuto di San Marino (1946)
	Due lettere anonime (1945)
	La resa di Titì (1945)
	Nessuno torna indietro (1945)
	Tristi amori (1943)
  A Living Statue (1943)
	Il nostro prossimo (1943)
	Quattro passi fra le nuvole (1942)
	Pastor Angelicus (1942)
	Quarta pagina (1942)
	La maestrina (1942)
	Primo amore (1941)
	La corona di ferro (1941)
	Ridi pagliaccio! (1941)
	Giuliano de' Medici (1941)
	Senza cielo (1940)
	Don Pasquale (1940)
	Una romantica avventura (1940)
	La peccatrice (1940)
 Beyond Love (1940)
	Melodie eterne (1940)
	La Nascita di Salomè (1940)
 One Hundred Thousand Dollars (1940)
	Un'avventura di Salvator Rosa (1939)
	Backstage
	Il documento (1939)
	Cavalleria rusticana (1939)
	Una moglie in pericolo (1939)
	I grandi magazzini (1939)
	Castelli in aria (1939)
	Napoli che non muore (1939)
	Ettore Fieramosca (1938)
	Napoli d'altri tempi (1938)
	Partire (1938)
 	Le due madri (1938)
	Il corsaro nero (1937)
	I due misantropi (1937, uncredited)
	I due sergenti (1936, uncredited)

References

1906 births
1995 deaths
20th-century classical composers
Italian film score composers
Italian opera composers
Italian male film score composers
People from Pescara
Nastro d'Argento winners
20th-century Italian composers
20th-century Italian male musicians